The South Pacific Underwater Medicine Society (SPUMS) is a primary source of information for diving and hyperbaric medicine physiology worldwide.

History 
The SPUMS was founded on May 3, 1971 in the wardroom of HMAS PENGUIN. The founding members of SPUMS were Carl Edmonds, Bob Thomas, Douglas Walker, Ian Unsworth, and Cedric Deal and they were joined by approximately 20 others as "charter members". The society was incorporated in 1990.

Purpose 
The aims of SPUMS have never changed since its inception:
 To promote and facilitate the study of all aspects of underwater and hyperbaric medicine;
 To provide information on underwater and hyperbaric medicine;
 To publish a journal and;
 To convene members of each Society annually at a scientific conference.

Training 
SPUMS offers a Diploma of Diving and Hyperbaric Medicine. This certification, was the first non-naval certification and for years the only postgraduate education available. The first Diplomas by examination were awarded to Chris Acott, Gavin Dawson, and John Knight in 1975.

Publications 
In 1971, a newsletter was published by Dr. Carl Edmonds and distributed to diving medical professionals. This newsletter grew to become the Journal of the South Pacific Underwater Medicine Society in 1975. The journal's name was changed to Diving and Hyperbaric Medicine in 2007 and incorporated the Journal of the European Underwater and Baromedical Society in 2008.

Prior to 2008, 77% of the journal articles were from Australia and New Zealand. After 2008 the journal's two largest contributors have been Australia and the United Kingdom with 44% of the articles and 20 other countries contributing the remainder.

The journal contains original and review articles, case series and reports, educational and general interest material in the form of:
 The diving doctor's diary;
 The world as it is;
 Critical appraisals (CATs) and Cochrane reviews;
 Opinion papers and Commentaries;
 Reprints of full Articles and Abstracts from the literature;
 Letters to the Editor;
 Book reviews;
 Society News & Notices.

Diving and Hyperbaric Medicine is ISI-indexed on SCIE and indexed on EMBASE. In 2011, Diving and Hyperbaric Medicine was approved for indexation in MEDLINE. The journal also began accepting advertisements from industry to assist with the cost of maintaining a high quality journal but also made clear that advertisements did not represent endorsement of those products or services by the organizations.

SPUMS also publishes many policies to assist clinicians and diving professionals.

Many of the SPUMS publications are available online at the Rubicon Research Repository.

References

External links 
 SPUMS web site
 

Diving medicine organizations
Diving organizations